Nanda Primavera (23 August 1898 – 9 August 1995) was an Italian actress. She appeared in more than thirty films from 1936 to 1988.

Filmography

References

External links 

1898 births
1995 deaths
Italian film actresses